Jesse Hawkes is an American action television series that on CBS aired from April 22 until May 27, 1989. The series is a spin-off of High Mountain Rangers.

Premise
Jesse Hawkes and his two sons track down criminals in San Francisco with the skills they honed in the Sierras.

Cast
Robert Conrad as Jesse Hawkes
Christian Conrad as Matt Hawkes
Shane Conrad as Cody Hawkes

Episodes

References

External links

1989 American television series debuts
1989 American television series endings
American action television series
English-language television shows
CBS original programming
Television shows set in San Francisco
American television spin-offs